Justus Koech (born 19 March 1980 in Uasin Gishu) is a Kenyan middle-distance runner who specializes in the 800 metres.

He finished sixth at the 2003 World Championships in Paris and won a bronze medal at the 2003 All-Africa Games in Abuja.

His personal best time is 1:44.16 minutes, achieved in July 2003 in Nairobi.

External links

Pace Sports Management

1980 births
Living people
Kenyan male middle-distance runners
African Games bronze medalists for Kenya
African Games medalists in athletics (track and field)
Athletes (track and field) at the 2003 All-Africa Games